PPK may refer to:

Politics
 Parliamentary Party of Kosovo
 Peruvians for Change (Peruanos Por el Kambio), a political party in Peru

Other uses
 Ppk, a process performance index
 PPK (trance duo), a Russian trance duo
 .ppk, PuTTY private key  file format
 Walther PPK, a variant of the Walther PP pistol
 Pedro Pablo Kuczynski (born 1938), also known as PPK, former President of Peru
 Personal preference kit, an allowance of personal items that an astronaut can bring on a mission